Every Day of My Life may refer to:

Every Day of My Life, the autobiography of singer-songwriter Beeb Birtles
Everyday of My Life, a 1976 album by Michael Bolton
"Everyday of My Life (Little River Band song)", a 1976 song by Little River Band on the album After Hours
"Ev'ry Day of My Life", a 1954 song recorded by Bobby Vinton
Ev'ry Day of My Life (album), a 1972 album by Bobby Vinton